Restart is the debut studio album by Brazilian teen pop band, Restart, released in November 2009. It was released digitally May 20, 2010 via iTunes.

The album was commercially successful with its first single, "Recomeçar", which entered top-ten positions in Brazilian charts, It charted #2 in Top 20 ABPD. More than 100,000 copies have been sold so far, being certified Platinum by ABPD.

Track list

Singles 

2009 albums
Restart (band) albums